Michal Suchánek (born 25 July 1965) is a Czech actor, moderator and comedian. He is the writer and actor in the popular Czech and Slovak TV show Tele Tele along with his friend Richard Genzer.

Suchánek was born in Jičín, but grew in Sobotka. He became a child actor at age 9. He later studied at Prague Conservatory. He acted in many famous theaters, like Národní divadlo and Činoherní klub and in number of films.

After Tele Tele the popular television show with great popularity in Czech Republic and Slovakia, he co-wrote with Genzer many other shows as Mr. GS and Máš minutu!. He is also one of the actors in the Czech version of Partička.

Filmography
 2018: Pepa
 2011: O mé rodině a jiných mrtvolách (TV seriál)
 2008: Sněženky a machři po 25 letech
 2007: Angelika (divadelní záznam)
 2006: Prachy dělaj člověka
 2005: Tři mušketýři (divadelní záznam)
 2005: Ulice (TV seriál)
 2004: Tři
 2000: Pra pra pra (TV seriál)
 1999: Agáta
 1999: Policajti z předměstí (TV seriál)
 1996: Dvě z policejní brašny (TV film)
 1996: Hospoda (TV seriál)
 1996: Na hraně (TV seriál)
 1996: O sirotkovi z Radhoště (TV film)
 1995: Byl jednou jeden polda
 1995: Přijeď si pro mě, tady straší (TV film)
 1995: Šaty dělají mrtvolu (TV film)
 1994: Bylo nás pět (TV seriál)
 1994: Ještě větší blbec, než jsme doufali
 1993: Arabela se vrací aneb Rumburak králem Říše pohádek (TV seriál)
 1993: Zvláštní schopnosti (TV film)
 1992: Ať ten kůň mlčí! (TV film)
 1992: Kocourkov (TV film)
 1992: Osvětová přednáška v Suché Vrbici (TV film)
 1991: Panenka s porcelánovou hlavičkou (TV film)
 1991: Tankový prapor
 1991: Území bílých králů (TV seriál)
 1990: Jak s Kubou šili všichni čerti (TV film)
 1990: Pohádky pod lupou (TV seriál)
 1990: Pražákům, těm je hej
 1990: Zvonokosy (TV film)
 1989: Poklad rytíře Miloty
 1989: Příběh '88
 1989: Případ pro zvláštní skupinu (TV seriál)
 1989: Strom pohádek: Pasáček a císařova dcera (TV film)
 1988: Láska na inzerát (TV film)
 1988: Rozsudky soudce Ooky (TV film)
 1988: Sedm hladových
 1988: Ten tretí (TV film)
 1988: Zlatá flétna (TV film)
 1987: Modré kráľovstvo (TV film)
 1987: Proč?
 1987: Přízrak (TV film)
 1987: Strom pohádek (TV seriál)
 1987: Sychravé království (TV film)
 1987: Zírej, holube! (TV film)
 1986: Klobouk, měšec a láska (TV film)
 1986: Krajina s nábytkem
 1986: Smutné radosti (TV film)
 1986: Velká filmová loupež
 1985: Dva t. č. v zel. hl. dvě veselé nekuř. (TV film)
 1985: Jako jed
 1985: Náušnice (TV film)
 1985: Třetí patro (TV seriál)
 1985: Večeře se šampaňským (TV film)
 1984: Bambinot (TV seriál)
 1984: Rozprávky pätnástich sestier (TV seriál)
 1984: Sanitka (TV seriál)
 1983: Anička Jurkovičová (TV film)
 1983: Hrátky (TV film)
 1983: Stav ztroskotání
 1982: Farba tvojich očí (TV film)
 1982: O smelom krajčírikovi (TV film)
 1982: Sněženky a machři
 1981: Katera (TV film)
 1980: Jen si tak trochu písknout
 1978: Spadla z nebe (TV seriál)
 1976: Šťastné a veselé (TV film)
 1976: Terezu bych kvůli žádné holce neopustil
 1975: Brána k domovu (TV film)
 1974: Pozdní léto (TV film)
 1974: Vodník a Zuzana (TV film)

References

External links

1965 births
Living people
Czech male child actors
Czech male film actors
Czech male television actors
Prague Conservatory alumni
People from Jičín
Czech comedians
20th-century Czech male actors
21st-century Czech male actors